Penny Bridge was a station along the Long Island Rail Road's Lower Montauk Branch that runs from Long Island City to Jamaica, Queens, in the state of New York. During its existence, the station served local industry as well as the Calvary Cemetery. Before the Kosciuszko Bridge was built, it also served businesses on the Brooklyn side of Newtown Creek (the name referring to the hridge that formerly connected Laurel Hill Boulevard to Meeker Avenue before it was closed in 1939) prior to the closure and removal of the bridge.

History 
This station first opened on June 26, 1854, by the Flushing Railroad to serve Calvary Cemetery. The Flushing Railroad was purchased by the New York and Flushing Railroad in April 1859. The station, in June 1859, was renamed Calvary Cemetery. The station closed on November 14, 1869. After the line was acquired by the South Side Railroad of Long Island in 1869 the station reopened on August 6, 1870. The Long Island Rail Road purchased the line in 1874 and consolidated the line into its system in 1876. The station was closed on July 30, 1880, before reopening on June 2, 1883. The station was closed permanently on March 16, 1998, along with Haberman, Glendale, Fresh Pond and Richmond Hill stations due to very low ridership; at the time of closure, the station served an average of one commuter per day.

References

Former Long Island Rail Road stations in New York City
Railway stations in Queens, New York
Railway stations in the United States opened in 1854
Railway stations in the United States opened in 1870
Railway stations in the United States opened in 1883
Railway stations closed in 1869
Railway stations closed in 1880
Railway stations closed in 1998
Long Island City
1854 establishments in New York (state)
1870 establishments in New York (state)
1883 establishments in New York (state)
1869 disestablishments in New York (state)
1880 disestablishments in New York (state)
1998 disestablishments in New York (state)